Stephen Dugald Cotter (September 15, 1940 – February 10, 2022) was a Canadian football player who played for the Edmonton Eskimos and BC Lions. He won the Grey Cup with the Lions in 1964. He played college football at Wenatchee Valley College.

References

1940 births
2022 deaths
BC Lions players
Edmonton Elks players
Players of Canadian football from British Columbia
Canadian football people from Vancouver
Steve